Ailuravus is a genus of prehistoric rodents in the family Ischyromyidae.

Ailuravus macrurus
Ailuravus macrurus ("big-tailed cat-ancestor") was a primitive, squirrel-like rodent, one of the earliest known rodents, from the Messel pit Lagerstätte, in Germany.  It lived during the Eocene period of Europe, in forests, and may have been arboreal. Furthermore, this species was discovered to have inhabited South Asia, specifically India. This was found through the comparison of the teeth found from each organism from both places. Due to this discovery, there is thought to be a connection between South Asia and Europe before they were separated and shifted into continents.
In India, Ailuravus macrurus are thought to have inhabited the Cambay Basin, so they most likely preferred to live near aquatic regions along with fish species.

References

Eocene rodents
Prehistoric mammals of Europe
Fossil taxa described in 1891
Prehistoric rodent genera